William Downey (1832 – June 30, 1909) was an Irish soldier who fought in the American Civil War. Downey received the United States' highest award for bravery during combat, the Medal of Honor, for his action at Ashepoo River, South Carolina on 24 May 1864. He was honored with the award on 21 January 1897.

Biography
Downey was born in Limerick, Ireland in 1832, and joined the US Army from Fall River, Massachusetts in September 1863. He was captured at the Battle of Gainesville, and paroled in April 1865. He was mustered out in June 1865. 

Downey died on 30 June 1909 and his remains are interred at Saint Mary's Cemetery in New Bedford, Massachusetts.

Medal of Honor citation

See also

List of American Civil War Medal of Honor recipients: A–F

References

1832 births
1909 deaths
Irish-born Medal of Honor recipients
People of Massachusetts in the American Civil War
Union Army officers
United States Army Medal of Honor recipients
American Civil War recipients of the Medal of Honor